Laurie Walker may refer to:
Laurie Walker (footballer) (born 1989), English footballer
Laurie Walker (artist) (1962–2011), Canadian artist

See also
Larry Walker (disambiguation)
Laura Walker (disambiguation) 
Lawrence Walker (disambiguation)